Clipjoint is a novel by Wilhelmina Baird published by Ace in 1996.

Plot summary
Clipjoint is a cyberpunk novel told from the point of view of the heroine.

Reception
Steve Faragher reviewed Clipjoint for Arcane magazine, rating it a 7 out of 10 overall. Faragher comments that "this is a very enjoyable book, fully in the un-put-downable frame. The first one's even better."

Reviews
Review by Faren Miller (1994) in Locus, #404 September 1994 
Review by M. J. Simpson (1996) in SFX, July 1996 
Review by Chris Gilmore (1996) in Interzone, #111 September 1996

References

1996 novels